Liga Deportiva Universitaria de Quito's 1973 season was the club's 43rd year of existence, the 20th year in professional football and the 1st in the Segunda Categoría.

Squad

Competitions

Segunda Categoría de Pichincha

Results

References

External links
  

1973